Heliozela gracilis is a moth of the Heliozelidae family. It was described by Zeller in 1873. It is found in North America, including Texas.

References

Moths described in 1873
Heliozelidae